Mihlali Mpongwana (born 15 May 2000) is a South African cricketer. He made his List A debut for Western Province in the 2018–19 CSA Provincial One-Day Challenge on 20 January 2019. He made his first-class debut for Western Province in the 2018–19 CSA 3-Day Provincial Cup on 14 March 2019. In September 2019, he was named in Western Province's squad for the 2019–20 CSA Provincial T20 Cup. He made his Twenty20 debut for Western Province in the 2019–20 CSA Provincial T20 Cup on 14 September 2019. In April 2021, he was named in Western Province's squad, ahead of the 2021–22 cricket season in South Africa.

References

External links
 

2000 births
Living people
South African cricketers
Western Province cricketers
Place of birth missing (living people)